Jonathan L. Snyder (November 29, 1859 – November 23, 1918) was president of the U.S. state of Michigan's State Agricultural College (now Michigan State University) from 1896 to 1915. Snyder Hall, part of the Snyder–Phillips building in the Red Cedar residential complex, is named in his honor; Snyder–Phillips houses the Residential College in Arts & Humanities.

External links
Biographical Information (Michigan State University Archives & Historical Collections)

1859 births
1918 deaths
Presidents of Michigan State University